Philophobia (from Greek "φιλέω-φιλώ" (love) and "φοβία" (phobia)) is the fear of falling in love. Not included in the DSM-5. The risk is usually when a person has confronted any emotional turmoil relating to love but also can be a chronic phobia. This affects the quality of life and pushes a person away from commitment. A negative aspect of this fear of being in love or falling in love is that it keeps a person in solitude. It can also evolve out of religious and cultural beliefs that prohibit love. It represents certain guilt and frustration towards the reaction coming from inside.

References

Phobias
Love